Caenocara is a genus of beetles in the family Ptinidae. Members of this genus are sometimes called puffball beetles.

Species
Species include:

 Caenocara affine Boheman, 1858
 Caenocara bicolor Germar, 1824
 Caenocara blanchardi Fall, 1905
 Caenocara bovistae Hoffmann, 1803
 Caenocara californicum LeConte, 1878
 Caenocara frontale Fall, 1905
 Caenocara ineptum Fall, 1905
 Caenocara laterale LeConte, 1878
 Caenocara neomexicanum Fall, 1905
 Caenocara nigricorne Manee, 1915
 Caenocara oculata Say, 1824
 Caenocara ovale Fall, 1905
 Caenocara scymnoides LeConte, 1865
 Caenocara simile Say, 1835
 Caenocara subglobosum Mulsant & Rey, 1864
 Caenocara tenuipalpum  Fall, 1905

References

Bostrichiformia genera
Ptinidae